Joël Gallopin (born 29 January 1953) is a French former racing cyclist. He rode in four editions of the Tour de France between 1978 and 1981.

Major results
1978
 10th Overall Circuit Cycliste Sarthe
1979
 8th Bordeaux–Paris
1980
 1st Stage 4 Tour de Corse
 7th Overall Étoile de Bessèges
1981
 7th GP de la Ville de Rennes

References

External links
 

1953 births
Living people
French male cyclists
People from Rambouillet
Sportspeople from Yvelines
Cyclists from Île-de-France
21st-century French people
20th-century French people